Two or Three Graces (1926), Aldous Huxley's fourth collection of short fiction, consists of the following four short pieces:

"Two or Three Graces"
"Half Holiday"
"The Monocle"
"Fairy Godmother"

External links
 Full text of Two or Three Graces at the Internet Archive

1926 short story collections
Short story collections by Aldous Huxley